Martina Thorogood Heemsen (born October 4, 1975 in Valencia)  is a Venezuelan pageant titleholder who was crowned Miss Venezuela 1999 and represented her country at Miss World 1999.

Pageant participation

Miss Venezuela 1999
Thorogood competed in the national beauty pageant Miss Venezuela 1999 where she won the title. She also won the special awards of  Miss Internet and Miss Integral. She represented the state of Miranda at the contest.

Miss World 1999
Thorogood was the official representative of Venezuela to the Miss World 1999 pageant held in London, England, UK on December 4, 1999, where she finished as the 1st Runner-up to the eventual winner, Yukta Mookhey of India.

After competing in Miss World she was to compete in Miss Universe 2000 but her entry was denied by the Miss Universe Organization because she was the 1st Runner-Up in Miss World and there was a chance that she could assume the title should the winner resign or lose her crown.

References

External links
Miss Venezuela Official Website
Miss World Official Website

1975 births
Living people
Miss World 1999 delegates
Venezuelan people of English descent
Venezuelan people of German descent
Miss Venezuela winners
People from Valencia, Venezuela
Lake Forest College alumni